Coming out or coming out of the closet is a figure of speech referring to lesbian, gay, bisexual, and transsexual (LGBT) people's disclosure of their sexual orientation or gender identity.

Coming out may also refer to:

Film and television
 Coming Out (1989 film), an East German feature film directed by Heiner Carow
 Coming Out (2000 film), a short film directed by Kim Ji-woon
 Coming Out (2013 film), a Hungarian film
 Coming Out (TV series), a Canadian television series
 "I'm Coming Out", an episode of American television series Ugly Betty

Music
 Coming Out (album), a 1976 album by the Manhattan Transfer
 "I'm Coming Out", a 1980 Diana Ross song

Other uses
 Coming Out (novel), a 2006 novel by Danielle Steel
 Coming-out party, a traditional term for a debutante's ball

See also
 Come Out (Reich), a piece of music by Steve Reich
 Come-outer, a radical abolition movement in 19th century America